Solberga may refer to:
 Solberga, Nässjö, Jönköping County, Sweden
 Solberga, Österåker, Stockholm County, Sweden
 Solberga Abbey, a former Cistercian nunnery in Sweden